Izzat may refer to:

 Izzat (given name), including a list of people with the name
 Izzat (honour), the concept of honor in North India, Bangladesh and Pakistan
 Izzat (1937 film), a Hindi film directed by Franz Osten 
 Izzat (1960 film), a Pakistani film
 Izzat (1968 film), a Bollywood film
 Izzat (1991 film), a Hindi film starring Jackie Shroff
 Izzat (2005 film), a 2005 Norwegian film

See also
 Izzet, a Turkish name
 Izet, a Bosnian name